Evelyn Marion Hickmans (9 April 1882 - 16 January 1972) was a pioneer in developing a treatment for phenylketonuria together with Horst Bickel and John Gerrard. She was an author and co- author of publications about blood chemistry and childhood diseases.

Early life

Evelyn was born in 1882 in Wolverhampton.

Professional career

She took her first and master's degrees at the University of Birmingham. One of the first biochemists appointed in Birmingham, she worked closely in the 1920s with Dr Leonard Parsons, first Lecturer in the Diseases of Childhood appointed to Birmingham Medical School, later appointed the School's first chair in paediatrics (1928). Their work on fat absorption in cases of coeliac syndromes, would be further clarified by work undertaken by Parson's successor, Professor J. M. Smellie and a team that would include John Gerrard and Charlotte Anderson. Hickmans came to notice when she, Horst Bickel and John Gerrard were persuaded by a persistent mother to help her daughter who was suffering from phenylketonuria. They created a diet that was low in phenylalanine and the daughter's condition improved.

In 1962, she and her team were awarded the John Scott Medal for their invention of a method for controlling phenylketonuria.

She died in Wolverhampton on 16 January 1972, aged 89.

References

English women chemists
People from Wolverhampton
English biochemists
20th-century chemists
20th-century British scientists
20th-century British women scientists
Alumni of the University of Birmingham
1882 births
1972 deaths
20th-century English women
20th-century English people